DSRV-2 Avalon was a Mystic-class deep-submergence rescue vehicle rated to dive up to  to rescue submarine crews trapped deep under the sea.

Avalon was launched in 1971. Avalon is battery-powered, and would have needed to pause midway through a rescue mission to recharge its batteries.

Avalon was stationed at North Island Naval Station in San Diego and was never required to conduct an actual rescue operation. The sub was decommissioned in 2000. The Avalon submarine was donated to the Morro Bay Maritime Museum in Morro Bay, California, and is currently on public display.

Awards
 Meritorious Unit Commendation with star (2 awards)
 Navy E Ribbon (2 awards)
 National Defense Service Medal with star (2 awards)

See also

References

 

 

1971 ships
Cold War submarines of the United States
Mystic-class deep-submergence rescue vehicles
Ships built in the San Francisco Bay Area